The Northwestern University School of Professional Studies (SPS) is one of twelve schools comprising Northwestern University, with campuses in Evanston and Chicago, Illinois. The school was founded in 1933 under its original name of "University College."

The School of Professional Studies offers highly specialized degree programs at the undergraduate, post-baccalaureate, graduate, post-graduate, and professional development levels. With more than 2,500 students, SPS has campuses in both Evanston and downtown Chicago in the Streeterville neighborhood. Northwestern SPS is led by Thomas F. Gibbons, who joined the university in 1992 and was appointed Dean of the college in 2002.

Academics

Undergraduate programs
The School of Professional Studies offers twelve undergraduate degree programs ranging from Biological Sciences, Communication Systems, Economics, Organization Behavior, Mathematics, Psychology, and more.

Graduate programs 
SPS graduate programs encompass a wide range of data science, public policy, and humanities master's degrees. Most SPS master's degree programs are offered on campus and online. SPS was one of the first institutions to dedicate a master's degree program to predictive analytics and data science. Programs include an MA/MFA in Creative Writing, MS in Data Science, MS in Global Health, MS in Health Informatics, MS in Health Communications, MS in Information Design and Strategy, MS in Information Systems, MA in Liberal Studies, MA in Literature, MA in Public Policy and Administration, MS in Regulatory Compliance, and MA in Sports Administration.

Professional development
In addition to its degree programs, SPS also offers certificate programs geared toward professional development. These programs are offered at Northwestern campuses in Evanston, Chicago and Schaumburg. Many of the programs consist of undergraduate courses that can be taken for credit. There are also noncredit programs filled with courses that exist outside the undergraduate curriculum.

Post-baccalaureate certificates
SPS also offers certificates in post-baccalaureate programs. Many students use the post-baccalaureate programs to build their academic résumés in preparation for graduate study in business, education, medicine or law, while others enroll in programs to help advance their professional careers. Programs consist of non-credit courses held during the daytime and evening. Duration of programs varies from one day to twelve weeks. Post-baccalaureate certificate programs are offered in 31 different subjects.

One of the most popular certificates at SPS is the Professional Health Careers program, a post-baccalaureate program designed to provide students with the pre-medicine background necessary to apply to medical school. The program consists of four concentrations: pre-medicine (dentistry, veterinary medicine, physician assistant, pharmacy, osteopathic medicine, podiatry), physical therapy, nursing, and clinical psychology.

Summer session
SPS oversees Northwestern University Summer Session. Current college students, high school students, and individuals seeking professional development or personal enrichment can choose from over 300 course offerings during the summer, including intensive language and science sequences, where a full year of credit can be earned, or a three-day summer institute.

College preparation program
SPS also oversees the Northwestern University College Preparation Program. This summer program for high school students offers three, six, and nine-week options as part of Northwestern’s Summer Session. Students can choose from over 350 undergraduate courses and can earn college credit for the courses they take, allowing students an opportunity to explore a variety of academic areas and get a head-start on a college career.

College Prep holds weekly Get Ready seminars designed to prepare students for the transition between high school and college life, and how to navigate the college admissions and application process.

Media
Continuum is the annual magazine for Northwestern SPS that features a range of stories highlighting SPS faculty, students, and alumni.

Rankings and statistics
In 2014, U.S. News & World Report ranked the college's Master's in Public Policy Administration (MPPA) program a top public affairs graduate program in the nation.

Notable faculty
 Chris Abani, Nigerian author 
 Stuart Dybek, American writer
 Reginald Gibbons, American poet, fiction writer, translator, literary critic, artist
William Lester, author and Fulbright Scholar
 Ed Roberson, American poet
 Ricca Slone, former member of the Illinois House of Representatives

Notable alumni
 Chester Gould, American cartoonist
 Curt Menefee, American sportscaster
 Eddie T. Johnson, former Superintendent of the Chicago Police Department
 Patti Solis Doyle, American political operative and longtime aide to Hillary Clinton

References

External links
Official website

Northwestern University
Educational institutions established in 1933
1933 establishments in Illinois